

1900s
 In 1926, American sports psychologist Coleman Griffith published his first book entitled The Psychology of Coaching: A Study of Coaching Methods in the Point of View of Psychology. 
 In 1951, John Lawther of Penn State University published Psychology of Coaching. 
 in 1967 Curtiss Gaylord published a book titled Modern Coaching Psychology, the first book to use "coaching psychology" in its title
 In 1970, James William Moore published The Psychology of Athletic Coaching.
 In 1976, Tim Gallwey publishes the book, The Inner Game of Tennis
 In 1977, James O. Prochaska of the University of Rhode Island, and Carlo Di Clemente and colleagues developed the transtheoretical model.
 In 1981, earliest known mention of S.M.A.R.T. goals
 In the late 1980s and 1990s, the GROW model was developed in the United Kingdom and was used extensively in corporate coaching.
 In 1997, Max Landsberg writes up GROW model in The tao of coaching

21st century
 In January 2000, Anthony Grant established the Coaching Psychology Unit at University of Sydney and through his doctoral studies set the stage for further research into coaching as an evidence-based discipline.
 In 2003, International Journal of Mentoring and Coaching in Education was formed 
 In 2005, the journal The Coaching Psychologist was founded by the British Psychological Society. 
 In 2006, Australian Psychological Society (APS) founded the Interest Group in Coaching Psychology (IGCP).
 In 2006, British Psychological Society (BPS) formed the Special Group in Coaching Psychology (SGCP).
 On December 18, 2006, the International Society for Coaching Psychology (ISCP) was founded in order to promote the international development of the field.
 In 2006, The Australian Psychological Society founded the International Coaching Psychology Review (since 2006). 
 In 2008, The Journal Coaching: An International Journal of Theory, Research and Practice was formed.
 In 2009, International Society of Coaching Psychology founded the journal, Coaching Psychology International
 In 2009, Swedish Coaching Psychology Group was formed
 2011, Society for Coaching changed name to "International Centre for Coaching Psychology Research
 In 2012, The Danish Journal of Coaching Psychology was founded

References 

 Additional references

 
 
 
 

Coaching
Psychology lists